Scheidgen is a town in the commune of Consdorf, in eastern Luxembourg.  , the town has a population of 449.

Echternach (canton)
Towns in Luxembourg